FOLK2FOLK is a Marketplace lending platform (MPL) specialising in secured lending for business owners across regional Britain. It matches businesses looking for capital with a local individual (retail) and institutional investors who receive a fixed interest rate, typically 6.5% p.a. secured against UK land or property. Investors receive the same interest rate that the Borrower pays, with FOLK2FOLK making its profit from an arrangement fee and annual renewal fee charged to Borrowers.

Formed in 2013, FOLK2FOLK is based on the idea that 'good folks' could help other 'good folks', FOLK2FOLK enables money to be borrowed and lent based on the concept of 'fair exchange' and secured against land and property. FOLK2FOLK's purpose is to create prosperity for Britain's regions. Since 2013, more than half a billion has been invested via the platform with zero investor losses.

People  
FOLK2FOLK's Managing Director, Roy Warren, appointed in September 2019 has been the company's Head of Risk & Loan Portfolio for four years. FOLK2FOLK's chairman is Tim Sawyer CBE, CEO of Bank of Maldives and formerly Chief Investment Officer of Innovate UK the investment arm of the UK Government and a former CEO of Start-Up UK. In June 2022, the company appointed Gary Leitch as COO, who previously held managing director roles at Paragon and Lombard.

History 
FOLK2FOLK was founded in 2013 in Cornwall when the nation was still reeling from the global financial crisis, banks were withdrawing from many rural areas, funding for businesses was drying up, and savers were receiving rock-bottom levels of interest. The company was founded to help solve this local problem but has since grown to expand nationally to help rural businesses across the UK.

Regulation 
FOLK2FOLK is authorised and regulated by the Financial Conduct Authority.

Sectors 
FOLK2FOLK borrowers come from a variety of sectors, including renewable energy, property development, agriculture, hospitality, leisure, and tourism facilities, and land and property acquisition.

Loan Milestones 
After its first year in business (April 2014), FOLK2FOLK had secured £22m in loans.

By March 2015, FOLK2FOLK had introduced almost £50m of funding to borrowers predominantly in Cornwall and Devon.

By November 2015, it had introduced over £75 million of funding from its lenders.

In June 2016 the company had passed the £100m milestone of loans funded.

In August 2016, it had secured £107m worth of loans.

By August 2017 it had secured £176m in loans.

By October 2018 it had secured £250m in loans.

In September 2019 FOLK2FOLK achieved £300m in loans.

In January 2021, FOLK2FOLK achieved £400m in loans.

In January 2022, FOLK2FOLK announces a cumulative lending of £500m.

Other Milestones 
In October 2014, FOLK2FOLK chose Crediton as the location for its first agency outside of Cornwall. The expansion has helped over 100 new homes to be built and created new jobs.

In August 2015, the firm introduced funding to kick start a mixed-use development project that will help facilitate infrastructure for Cornwall's 6,000-seat sports stadium.

In the same month, it announced the appointment of Stifel, a global wealth management and investment banking firm, as its financial adviser.

In January, 2016, the company announced the creation of a 'legal panel' to support its national roll-out strategy. This national network of local law firms carries out the legal work necessary to complete loans in their locality and provides FOLK2FOLK with local knowledge as part of the security process.

In February 2016, it looked to place shares in the value of £3.5m. The offer consisted of £1.5m in new shares and £2m in shares offered by the founders.

According to Altfi Data: "FOLK2FOLK has seen year-on-year growth of 433% from August 2015 which compares favorably to the 60% growth of UK P2P (peer-to-peer) business lenders over the same time frame."

In August 2016, FOLK2FOLK moved into their new national headquarters at Number One, Launceston.

In August 2016, FOLK2FOLK pledged support to the Save the High Street campaign.

In January 2018, FOLK2FOLK launched The Local Lending Movement and FOLKONOMICS.

In September 2019, appointed Roy Warren as Managing Director.

In May 2020, the company announced it had achieved profitability.

In July 2020, FOLK2FOLK was accredited by the British Business Bank to deliver CBILS loans.

In July 2020, FOLK2FOLK announced its partnership with CrossLend.

In February 2021, FOLK2FOLK announced its evolution from a P2P platform to a Marketplace lending platform.

In June 2022, FOLK2FOLK appointed Gary Leitch as COO.

Awards 
In 2015, FOLK2FOLK was named Best Lending Platform for Small Businesses by news site, AltFi. An independent panel of industry experts and SMEs at the AltFi Awards 2015 said FOLK2FOLK had "excellent fundamentals, strong values, good customer engagement and clear transparency of fees". The judges of also highlighted that FOLK2FOLK's high street offices, which provide an opportunity for face-to-face meetings, was a "key advantage" for its customers, adding: "this kind of access cannot be underestimated or undervalued".

In 2017 FOLK2FOLK was named Small Business of the Year by Western Morning News in its Business Awards

In 2018 FOLK2FOLK was announced 'Alternative Finance Provider of the Year' at the Dealmakers awards

How it Works 
FOLK2FOLK introduces people and institutions with at least £20,000 to invest to businesses looking for finance of at least £100,000. The company requires loans to be secured by land or property owned by the borrower but not the borrower's home.  Investors are high net worth individuals or institutions.

It aims to enable businesses to access finance in weeks not months.

This model of allowing people in business to access interest-only funds (and an opportunity for people to lend within their local area) is said to have helped mobilise money in the countryside and re-energised many small businesses that would have otherwise lacked the necessary investment to develop.

According to one investor, it's a "very low risk lending proposition with a superb rate of return which can't be beaten by any deposit account". For borrowers, the interest rates will be higher than from a bank, but, according to one borrower, the speed, flexibility and interest-only repayment make up for it.

Ethos 
FOLK2FOLK promotes itself as a lender to the under-served SMEs in the rural and regional parts of the UK. It's on a mission to help level the playing field for small businesses in these areas of the UK, noting that they often don't have the same benefits as their urban counterparts i.e. access to finance, because many lenders don't understand the needs and values of rural businesses.  A by-product of the investment that FOLK2FOLK facilitates, often takes the form of job creation and a strengthening of local supply chains, for which FOLK2FOLK coined the term FOLKONOMICS™ to describe.

References 

Peer-to-peer lending companies
Financial services companies of England
Financial services companies established in 2013
Companies based in Cornwall
Launceston, Cornwall